Società Sportiva Juve Stabia is an Italian football club based in Castellammare di Stabia, Campania.

Juve Stabia currently plays in Serie C, the third tier of Italian football system.

History

The football in Castellammare di Stabia

From Stabia S.C. to S.S. Juventus Stabia

Stabia S.C.
The origins of football in the town of Castellammare di Stabia in the Metropolitan City of Naples can be traced to 19 March 1907, when Weiss, the Romano brothers and Pauzano founded the club as Stabia Sporting Club. In 1930, the club changed its name to F.C. Stabiese, and in summer 1933, it filed for bankruptcy.

A.C. Stabia
Stabia was refounded as A.C. Stabia by Salvatore Russo in 1933.

During the 1951–52 season, it played in Serie B.

In 1953, it was declared bankrupt.

S.S. Juventus Stabia

In 1953, the second club of the town, Società Sportiva Juventus Stabia, founded in 1945 becomes so the main team of Castellamare di Stabia and inherited the sporting tradition of the former club.

In 2001, the club declared bankruptcy.

From Comprensorio Stabia to S.S. Juve Stabia
In the summer 2002, entrepreneur Paolo D'Arco acquired the sports rights of Serie D of Comprensorio Nola and immediately renamed it Comprensorio Stabia and since the summer 2003 with the current name. At the end of the season, it was promoted to Serie C2 and in the next year, to Serie C1. In the 2008–09 season, the club was relegated to Lega Pro Seconda Divisione, but was immediately promoted the next season.

In the 2010–11 season, Juve Stabia was promoted in Serie B after 59 years. It played in the Italian second division for three consecutive seasons before being relegated in 2013–14.

Current squad
.

Out on loan

Coaching staff

Honours
 Campionato Italia Liberata
  Winners: 1945
 Serie C
 Champions: 1950–51, 2018-2019
Lega Pro Prima Divisione
Promoted:  2010–11 (After Play-Offs)
Lega Pro Seconda Divisione
Champions:  1992–93 (Serie C2), 2009–10
Serie D
Promoted: 1971–72, 1978–79, 1990–91, 2003–04
 Coppa Italia Lega Pro
 Winners: 2010–11
 Coppa Italia Serie D
 Winners: 2003–04

References

External links
Official site

 
Football clubs in Campania
Association football clubs established in 1907
Serie C clubs
1907 establishments in Italy
Coppa Italia Serie C winning clubs